Doggo Defile is a narrow, steep-sided defile, in parts less than  wide, cutting through the coastal mountains east of Dee Ice Piedmont, on the west coast of the Antarctic Peninsula. It was photographed from the air by the Ronne Antarctic Research Expedition in 1947, and was surveyed by the Falkland Islands Dependencies Survey in 1948–50, and 1958. The UK Antarctic Place-Names Committee name is descriptive; the northwest entrance is only partly visible to sledge parties traveling along the coast, and the true nature of the feature is completely hidden by the surrounding mountains (to "lie doggo" is a term meaning to "hide").

References 

Mountain passes of Graham Land
Fallières Coast